Lanjigarh Airstrip is a private airstrip owned by Vedanta Resources located at Lanjigarh in the Kalahandi district of Odisha. Nearest airport/airstrip to this airstrip is Utkela Airstrip in Kalahandi, Odisha.

References

Airports in Odisha
Kalahandi district
Vedanta Resources
Airports with year of establishment missing